Rastislav Pavlikovský (born March 2, 1977) is a retired Slovak professional ice hockey centre. He last played for MHK Dubnica in the Slovak 2. Liga.

Pavlikovský was part of the Slovakia men's national ice hockey team which won the 2002 IIHF World Championships. He also competed in the men's tournament at the 2002 Winter Olympics.

He last played the 2012-13 season with Linköping in the Elitserien.

His elder brother Richard is also a hockey international for Slovakia.

Career statistics

Regular season and playoffs

International

References

External links
 https://www.pavlikovsky.com/

1977 births
Living people
AIK IF players
Cincinnati Cyclones (IHL) players
Cincinnati Mighty Ducks players
Grand Rapids Griffins (IHL) players
HC Litvínov players
HC Sibir Novosibirsk players
HK Dubnica players
Houston Aeros (1994–2013) players
HV71 players
Jokerit players
KalPa players
Leksands IF players
Modo Hockey players
Mora IK players
Ottawa Senators draft picks
People from Dubnica nad Váhom
Sportspeople from the Trenčín Region
Philadelphia Phantoms players
Sault Ste. Marie Greyhounds players
Slovak ice hockey centres
Utah Grizzlies (IHL) players
ZSC Lions players
Olympic ice hockey players of Slovakia
Ice hockey players at the 2002 Winter Olympics
Slovak expatriate ice hockey players in the United States
Slovak expatriate ice hockey players in Canada
Slovak expatriate ice hockey players in Sweden
Slovak expatriate ice hockey players in Switzerland
Slovak expatriate ice hockey players in Finland
Slovak expatriate ice hockey players in Russia
Slovak expatriate ice hockey players in the Czech Republic